Poleymieux-au-Mont-d'Or is a commune in the Metropolis of Lyon, located in the administrative region of Auvergne-Rhône-Alpes, eastern France.

See also
Communes of the Metropolis of Lyon
André César Vermare sculptor monument to Ampére

References

Communes of Lyon Metropolis
Lyonnais